In mathematics, a complex analytic K3 surface is a compact connected complex manifold of dimension 2 with а trivial canonical bundle and irregularity zero. An (algebraic) K3 surface over any field means a smooth proper geometrically connected algebraic surface that satisfies the same conditions. In the Enriques–Kodaira classification of surfaces, K3 surfaces form one of the four classes of minimal surfaces of Kodaira dimension zero. A simple example is the Fermat quartic surface

in complex projective 3-space.

Together with two-dimensional compact complex tori, K3 surfaces are the Calabi–Yau manifolds (and also the hyperkähler manifolds) of dimension two. As such, they are at the center of the classification of algebraic surfaces, between the positively curved del Pezzo surfaces (which are easy to classify) and the negatively curved surfaces of general type (which are essentially unclassifiable). K3 surfaces can be considered the simplest algebraic varieties whose structure does not reduce to curves or abelian varieties, and yet where a substantial understanding is possible. A complex K3 surface has real dimension 4, and it plays an important role in the study of smooth 4-manifolds. K3 surfaces have been applied to Kac–Moody algebras, mirror symmetry and string theory.

It can be useful to think of complex algebraic K3 surfaces as part of the broader family of complex analytic K3 surfaces. Many other types of algebraic varieties do not have such non-algebraic deformations.

Definition
There are several equivalent ways to define K3 surfaces. The only compact complex surfaces with trivial canonical bundle are K3 surfaces and compact complex tori, and so one can add any condition excluding the latter to define K3 surfaces. For example, it is equivalent to define a complex analytic K3 surface as a simply connected compact complex manifold of dimension 2 with a nowhere-vanishing holomorphic 2-form. (The latter condition says exactly that the canonical bundle is trivial.)

There are also some variants of the definition. Over the complex numbers, some authors consider only the algebraic K3 surfaces. (An algebraic K3 surface is automatically projective.) Or one may allow K3 surfaces to have du Val singularities (the canonical singularities of dimension 2), rather than being smooth.

Calculation of the Betti numbers
The Betti numbers of a complex analytic K3 surface are computed as follows. (A similar argument gives the same answer for the Betti numbers of an algebraic K3 surface over any field, defined using l-adic cohomology.) By definition, the canonical bundle  is trivial, and the irregularity q(X) (the dimension  of the coherent sheaf cohomology group ) is zero. By Serre duality,

As a result, the arithmetic genus (or holomorphic Euler characteristic) of X is:

On the other hand, the Riemann–Roch theorem (Noether's formula) says: 

where  is the i-th Chern class of the tangent bundle. Since  is trivial, its first Chern class  is zero, and so .

Next, the exponential sequence  gives an exact sequence of cohomology groups , and so . Thus the Betti number  is zero, and by Poincaré duality,  is also zero. Finally,  is equal to the topological Euler characteristic

Properties
Any two complex analytic K3 surfaces are diffeomorphic as smooth 4-manifolds, by Kunihiko Kodaira.
Every complex analytic K3 surface has a Kähler metric, by Yum-Tong Siu. (Analogously, but much easier: every algebraic K3 surface over a field is projective.) By Shing-Tung Yau's solution to the Calabi conjecture, it follows that every complex analytic K3 surface has a Ricci-flat Kähler metric.
The Hodge numbers of any K3 surface are listed in the Hodge diamond:

One way to show this is to calculate the Jacobian ideal of a specific K3 surface, and then using a variation of Hodge structure on the moduli of algebraic K3 surfaces to show that all such K3 surfaces have the same Hodge numbers. In this case, Hodge symmetry forces , hence . For K3 surfaces in characteristic p > 0, this was first shown by Alexey Rudakov and Igor Shafarevich.
Yukio Matsumoto's 11/8 conjecture predicts that every smooth oriented 4-manifold X with even intersection form has second Betti number at least 11/8 times the absolute value of the signature. This would be optimal if true, since equality holds for a complex K3 surface, which has signature 3−19 = −16.
Every complex surface that is diffeomorphic to a K3 surface is a K3 surface, by Robert Friedman and John Morgan. On the other hand, there are smooth complex surfaces (some of them projective) that are homeomorphic but not diffeomorphic to a K3 surface, by Kodaira and Michael Freedman. These "homotopy K3 surfaces" all have Kodaira dimension 1.

Examples
The double cover X of the projective plane branched along a smooth sextic (degree 6) curve is a K3 surface of genus 2 (that is, degree 2g−2 = 2).
A Kummer surface is the quotient of a two-dimensional abelian variety A by the action . This results in 16 singularities, at the 2-torsion points of A. The minimal resolution of this singular surface may also be called a Kummer surface; that resolution is a K3 surface. When A is the Jacobian of a curve of genus 2, Kummer showed that the quotient  can be embedded into  as a quartic surface with 16 nodes.
More generally: for any quartic surface Y with du Val singularities, the minimal resolution of Y is an algebraic K3 surface.
There are several databases of K3 surfaces with du Val singularities in weighted projective spaces.

The Picard lattice
The Picard group Pic(X) of a complex analytic K3 surface X means the abelian group of complex analytic line bundles on X. For an algebraic K3 surface, Pic(X) means the group of algebraic line bundles on X. The two definitions agree for a complex algebraic K3 surface, by Jean-Pierre Serre's GAGA theorem.

The Picard group of a K3 surface X is always a finitely generated free abelian group; its rank is called the Picard number . It is an important feature of K3 surfaces that many different Picard numbers can occur. For X a complex algebraic K3 surface,  can be any integer between 1 and 20. In the complex analytic case,  may also be zero. (In that case, X contains no closed complex curves at all. By contrast, an algebraic surface always contains many continuous families of curves.) Over an algebraically closed field of characteristic p > 0, there is a special class of K3 surfaces, supersingular K3 surfaces, with Picard number 22.

The Picard lattice of a K3 surface means the abelian group Pic(X) together with its intersection form, a symmetric bilinear form with values in the integers. Over a general field, the intersection form can be defined using the intersection theory of curves on a surface, by identifying the Picard group with the divisor class group.) The Picard lattice of a K3 surface is always even, meaning that the integer  is even for each .

The Hodge index theorem implies that the Picard lattice of an algebraic K3 surface has signature . Many properties of a K3 surface are determined by its Picard lattice, as a symmetric bilinear form over the integers. This leads to a strong connection between the theory of K3 surfaces and the arithmetic of symmetric bilinear forms.

Roughly speaking, the space of all complex analytic K3 surfaces has complex dimension 20, while the space of K3 surfaces with Picard number  has dimension  (excluding the supersingular case). In particular, algebraic K3 surfaces occur in 19-dimensional families. More details about moduli spaces of K3 surfaces are given below.

The precise description of which lattices can occur as Picard lattices of K3 surfaces is complicated. The space of such surfaces has dimension .

Elliptic K3 surfaces
An important subclass of K3 surfaces, easier to analyze than the general case, consists of the K3 surfaces with an elliptic fibration . "Elliptic" means that all but finitely many fibers of this morphism are smooth curves of genus 1. The singular fibers are unions of rational curves, with the possible types of singular fibers classified by Kodaira. A general elliptic K3 surface has exactly 24 singular fibers, each of type  (a nodal cubic curve).

Whether a K3 surface is elliptic can be read from its Picard lattice. (In characteristic 2 or 3, the latter condition may also correspond to a quasi-elliptic fibration.) It follows that having an elliptic fibration is a codimension-1 condition on a K3 surface. So there are 19-dimensional families of complex analytic K3 surfaces with an elliptic fibration, and 18-dimensional moduli spaces of projective K3 surfaces with an elliptic fibration.

Example: Every smooth quartic surface X in  that contains a line L has an elliptic fibration , given by projecting away from L. The moduli space of all smooth quartic surfaces (up to isomorphism) has dimension 19, while the subspace of quartic surfaces containing a line has dimension 18.

Rational curves on K3 surfaces
In contrast to positively curved varieties such as del Pezzo surfaces, a complex algebraic K3 surface X is not uniruled; that is, it is not covered by a continuous family of rational curves. On the other hand, in contrast to negatively curved varieties such as surfaces of general type, X contains a large discrete set of rational curves (possibly singular). In particular, Fedor Bogomolov and David Mumford showed that every curve on X is linearly equivalent to a positive linear combination of rational curves.

Another contrast to negatively curved varieties is that the Kobayashi metric on a complex analytic K3 surface X is identically zero. The proof uses that an algebraic K3 surface X is always covered by a continuous family of images of elliptic curves. (These curves are singular in X, unless X happens to be an elliptic K3 surface.)

The period map
The space N of marked complex K3 surfaces is a non-Hausdorff complex manifold of dimension 20. (For example, the space of smooth quartic surfaces is irreducible of dimension 19, and yet every complex analytic K3 surface in the 20-dimensional family N has arbitrarily small deformations which are isomorphic to smooth quartics.) For the same reason, there is not a meaningful moduli space of compact complex tori of dimension at least 2.

The period mapping sends a K3 surface to its Hodge structure. When stated carefully, the Torelli theorem holds: a K3 surface is determined by its Hodge structure. The period domain is defined as the 20-dimensional complex manifold

The period mapping  sends a marked K3 surface X to the complex line . This is surjective, and a local isomorphism, but not an isomorphism (in particular because D is Hausdorff and N is not). However, the global Torelli theorem for K3 surfaces says that the quotient map of sets

is bijective.

Moduli spaces of projective K3 surfaces
This is also called a polarized K3 surface of degree 2g−2.

Under these assumptions, L is basepoint-free. In characteristic zero, Bertini's theorem implies that there is a smooth curve C in the linear system |L|. All such curves have genus g, which explains why (X,L) is said to have genus g.

The vector space of sections of L has dimension g + 1, and so L gives a morphism from X to projective space .

There is an irreducible coarse moduli space  of polarized complex K3 surfaces of genus g for each ; it can be viewed as a Zariski open subset of a Shimura variety for the group SO(2,19). For each g,  is a quasi-projective complex variety of dimension 19.

The different 19-dimensional moduli spaces  overlap in an intricate way. Indeed, there is a countably infinite set of codimension-1 subvarieties of each  corresponding to K3 surfaces of Picard number at least 2. Those K3 surfaces have polarizations of infinitely many different degrees, not just 2g–2. So one can say that infinitely many of the other moduli spaces  meet . This is imprecise, since there is not a well-behaved space containing all the moduli spaces . However, a concrete version of this idea is the fact that any two complex algebraic K3 surfaces are deformation-equivalent through algebraic K3 surfaces.

More generally, a quasi-polarized K3 surface of genus g means a projective K3 surface with a primitive nef and big line bundle L such that . The moduli space of quasi-polarized K3 surfaces of genus g is still irreducible of dimension 19 (containing the previous moduli space as an open subset). Formally, it works better to view this as a moduli space of K3 surfaces Y with du Val singularities.

The ample cone and the cone of curves
A remarkable feature of algebraic K3 surfaces is that the Picard lattice determines many geometric properties of the surface, including the convex cone of ample divisors (up to automorphisms of the Picard lattice). The ample cone is determined by the Picard lattice as follows. By the Hodge index theorem, the intersection form on the real vector space  has signature . Call the positive cone the component that contains any ample divisor on X.

Then the ample cone is equal to the positive cone. Thus it is the standard round cone.

Case 2: Otherwise, let , the set of roots of the Picard lattice. The orthogonal complements of the roots form a set of hyperplanes which all go through the positive cone. Then the ample cone is a connected component of the complement of these hyperplanes in the positive cone. Any two such components are isomorphic via the orthogonal group of the lattice Pic(X), since that contains the reflection across each root hyperplane. In this sense, the Picard lattice determines the ample cone up to isomorphism.

A related statement, due to Sándor Kovács, is that knowing one ample divisor A in Pic(X) determines the whole cone of curves of X. Namely, suppose that X has Picard number . If the set of roots  is empty, then the closed cone of curves is the closure of the positive cone. In the first case, X contains no (−2)-curves; in the second case, the closed cone of curves is the closed convex cone spanned by all (−2)-curves. (If , there is one other possibility: the cone of curves may be spanned by one (−2)-curve and one curve with self-intersection 0.) So the cone of curves is either the standard round cone, or else it has "sharp corners" (because every (−2)-curve spans an isolated extremal ray of the cone of curves).

Automorphism group
K3 surfaces are somewhat unusual among algebraic varieties in that their automorphism groups may be infinite, discrete, and highly nonabelian. By a version of the Torelli theorem, the Picard lattice of a complex algebraic K3 surface X determines the automorphism group of X up to commensurability. Namely, let the Weyl group W be the subgroup of the orthogonal group O(Pic(X)) generated by reflections in the set of roots . Then W is a normal subgroup of O(Pic(X)), and the automorphism group of X is commensurable with the quotient group O(Pic(X))/W. A related statement, due to Hans Sterk, is that Aut(X) acts on the nef cone of X with a rational polyhedral fundamental domain.

Relation to string duality
K3 surfaces appear almost ubiquitously in string duality and provide an important tool for the understanding of it. String compactifications on these surfaces are not trivial, yet they are simple enough to analyze most of their properties in detail. The type IIA string, the type IIB string, the E8×E8 heterotic string, the Spin(32)/Z2 heterotic string, and M-theory are related by compactification on a K3 surface. For example, the Type IIA string compactified on a K3 surface is equivalent to the heterotic string compactified on a 4-torus.

History
In 1909, Enriques showed that such surfaces exist for all , and Francesco Severi showed that the moduli space of such surfaces has dimension 19 for each g.

André  gave K3 surfaces their name (see the quotation above) and made several influential conjectures about their classification. Kunihiko Kodaira completed the basic theory around 1960, in particular making the first systematic study of complex analytic K3 surfaces which are not algebraic. He showed that any two complex analytic K3 surfaces are deformation-equivalent and hence diffeomorphic, which was new even for algebraic K3 surfaces. An important later advance was the proof of the Torelli theorem for complex algebraic K3 surfaces by Ilya Piatetski-Shapiro and Igor Shafarevich (1971), extended to complex analytic K3 surfaces by Daniel Burns and Michael Rapoport (1975).

See also
Enriques surface
Tate conjecture
Mathieu moonshine, a mysterious relationship between K3 surfaces and the Mathieu group M24.

Notes

References

External links
Graded Ring Database homepage for a catalog of K3 surfaces
K3 database for the Magma computer algebra system
The geometry of K3 surfaces, lectures by David Morrison (1988).

Algebraic surfaces
Complex surfaces
Differential geometry
String theory